Space Marines is a 1996 film directed by John Weidner.

Plot
In the future, space has been colonized. As humanity expanded, the Marine Corps became the Space Force. Colonel Fraser (John Pyper-Ferguson), a former Marine officer who has become a pirate, has his pirates hijack a new synthetic explosive. Light and concealable, it is the perfect improvised explosive device. He takes hostages at a local colony to draw out an Earth negotiator (James Shigeta), who is escorted by a Marine fire team under the command of Captain 'Gray Wolf' Gray (Edward Albert). He then takes him hostage on his ship, as well as the Sergeant in charge of the security detail. After a short space chase, he arrives with demands for gold in exchange for the negotiator's life. Colonel Fraser is killed by a new recruit, who shoots him through his own torso, killing them both in the process.

Cast
 Billy Wirth as Zack Delano
 Cady Huffman as Dar Mullins
 John Pyper-Ferguson as Colonel Fraser
 Edward Albert as Captain Tom "Gray Wolf" Gray
 Meg Foster as Commander Lasser
 Blake Boyd as "Tex"
 T.J. Myers as Hologram
 Michael Bailey Smith as Gunther
 Ed Spila as Rodney "Hot Rod"
 Sherman Augustus as Rudy
 Bill Brochtrup as Hacker
 Kevin Page as "Lucky"
 James Shigeta as Ambassador Nakamura
 John Mansfield as Vice Minister Adams
 Sean Hennigan as Chuck

References

External links
 
 

1990s science fiction action films
1996 films
American science fiction action films
1990s English-language films
1990s American films